Adam de Gordon may refer to:

 Adam de Gurdon (died 1305)
Adam de Gordon, lord of Gordon (died 1333)
Adam de Gordon (died 1402)

See also
Adam Gordon (disambiguation)